Yannick Bokolo (born June 19, 1985) is a retired French professional basketball player who last played for Élan Béarnais Pau-Orthez of the LNB Pro A.

Biography 
Born in Kinshasa, Zaire in 1985, Bokolo left the country aged 3 to move to Belgrade, Yugoslavia. At the age of 5, he moved to Strasbourg, France. Later, he joined the National basketball academy (INSEP), alongside Johan Petro and Terence Parker. Due to his successful international career with France youth, he then joined Le Mans, the team with whom he would win his first honors. He caught the eyes of the world with strong performances at the 2006 World Championships. After five years in Sarthe, Bokolo joined BCM Gravelines in 2008.

In May 2014, he signed a three-year deal with Élan Béarnais Pau-Orthez.

Awards and accomplishments

Club career
 French Basketball Cup : 2004
 Semaine des As : 2006
 French champion :2006
 Participation in All Star Game Nationale 1 : 2003
 Participation in All Star Game : 2004 and 2006

French national team 
 FIBA World Championship :
 5th in the 2006 FIBA World Championship in Japan
 European Championships :
 Played in the 2005 under-20 European Championships in Russia
 Played in the 2002 under-18 European Championships in Germany
 Played in the 2001 under-16 European Championships in Lithuania
 Others :
 French international since 2001
 France A international since 6 against Belgium

References

External links 
 Profile at LNB.fr
 Euroleague.net Profile

1985 births
Living people
Basketball players at the 2012 Summer Olympics
BCM Gravelines players
Centre Fédéral de Basket-ball players
Élan Béarnais players
French men's basketball players
French sportspeople of Democratic Republic of the Congo descent
Le Mans Sarthe Basket players
Olympic basketball players of France
Basketball players from Kinshasa
Point guards
Shooting guards
2010 FIBA World Championship players
2006 FIBA World Championship players
Black French sportspeople